Herpetogramma pseudomagna is a moth in the family Crambidae. It was described by Hiroshi Yamanaka in 1976. It is found in Japan and China.

The wingspan is 27–29 mm.

References

Moths described in 1976
Herpetogramma
Moths of Japan
Moths of Asia